The Bolivia–Brazil pipeline (GASBOL) is the longest natural gas pipeline in South America. The  pipeline connects Bolivia's gas sources with the south-east regions of Brazil.

The pipeline was built in two stages. It runs from Rio Grande, near Santa Cruz de la Sierra, to Corumbá in Mato Grosso do Sul, reaches Campinas in the state of São Paulo, and continues to Guararema, where it's connected with the Brazilian network.

The total cost of the pipeline was US$2.15 billion, of which US$1.72 billion was spent on the Brazilian section and US$435 million on the Bolivian section.

References

Natural gas pipelines in Bolivia
Natural gas pipelines in Brazil
Bolivia–Brazil relations